Deng Xia, courtesy name Yingyuan, was a Chinese military general and warrior of the Jin dynasty (266–420). He was a general under the Grand Marshal Huan Wen who distinguished himself as a powerful warrior in his campaigns. According to folklore, he was also a prodigy of the Chinese god, Erlang Shen, who helped the people of Xiangyang defeat a river dragon that terrorized the area.

Career under Huan Wen 
Deng Xia was from Chen Commandary and his father, Deng Yue (鄧嶽), once served the government. Deng Xia's strength was very well-known even among the common people, who began comparing him to the famous Han dynasty general Fan Kuai. He joined Huan Wen's army and became his Army Advisor. He eventually rose to the rank of General of the Best of the Army and Administrator of Jingling. Very few is recorded about his exact activities in Huan Wen's campaigns, but it was said he followed him in many of them which made him famous at the time.

In 352, Deng Xia assisted Zhou Fu (周撫) in besieging Xiao Jingwen (蕭敬文) although Zhou Fu had to eventually withdraw. Xiao Jingwen would be defeated by Sima Xun instead. 

In 362, Former Yan forces led by Lü Hu (呂護) besieged Luoyang. Deng Xia and the General of the Household Gentlemen of the North, Yu Xi (庾希) were sent by Huan Wen to reinforce the defenders. Lü Hu soon retreated but was hit by a stray arrow and died. Deng Xia advanced to Xincheng (新城; around present-day Fang County, Hubei), where he camped to defend the place.

Deng Xia's last noted activity would be in 369, during Huan Wen's campaign against Former Yan. He and Zhu Xu defeated the Former Yan general Fu Yan at Linzhu (林渚, around present-day Xinzheng, Henan). Ultimately, the campaign ended disastrously as Huan Wen was defeated at the Battle of Fangtou. Huan Wen was greatly angered and ashamed at his defeat. He had always feared that Deng Xia's courage would get in the way of his imperial ambition, so he used this campaign as an excuse to remove him from office. 

Some time after his removal from his office, Deng Xia visited the imperial tombs. Along the way, he met Huan Wen again, who noticed that Deng Xia had grown thinner. When he asked him why, Deng Xia said, "For being ashamed before Shuda, I am not able to not regret the broken pot." Deng Xia died not long after, and he was posthumously awarded the office of Grand Warden of Luling (廬陵; around present-day Ji'an, Jiangxi).

In folklore 
The people of Deng Xia's time believed that he was a general of the Chinese god, Erlang Shen. A folklore tells of Deng Xia killing a river dragon which parallels that of Erlang Shen's story. In the Mian River, it was said that there was a deep pool where lived a dragon who terrorized the people of Xiangyang. Deng Xia, serving as the Grand Warden of Xiangyang at the time, pulled out a sword and dived into the depths to kill it. According to the Book of Jin, the dragon coiled around his feet, and Deng Xia quickly chopped the dragon into pieces. The river ran red with blood, and with Deng Xia's bravery, the people of Xiangyang no longer worried about the dragon. 

Liu Jingshu's Yiyuan provided a different take on the story. Deng Xia went into the river to fight the dragon, but rather than with a sword, he defeated it with his fists and brought it ashore to kill it. However, his mother stopped him, saying that dragons are sacred creatures, and it would be wrong to kill them. Instead, she told him that he should cast an incantation on it to stop it from being violent. Deng Xia did so and released it into the river, and the dragon no longer posed a threat to the people of Xiangyang. 

Deng Xia's valour earned him the title "Erlang Shen" and there is a temple dedicated to him in Zhongqingli (忠清里), Hangzhou.

Note

References 

 Fang, Xuanling (ed.) (648). Book of Jin (Jin Shu).
 Liu, Yiqing (ed.) ( 5th century). A New Account of the Tales of the World (Shishuo Xinyu / Shiyu).
 Sima, Guang (1084). Zizhi Tongjian.
 Liu, Jingshu ( 5th century}). Garden of the Strange (Yiyuan)

370 deaths
Jin dynasty (266–420) generals
Deified Chinese people